Moytirra East Court Tomb, commonly called the Giant's Grave, is a court cairn and National Monument located in County Sligo, Ireland.

Location

History

Moytirra East Court Tomb was built c. 4000–2500 BC, in the Neolithic.

It was locally known as the Giant's Grave, and was said to hold the remains of a giant killed in the Battle of Moytura.

Description

Moytirra East Court Tomb has the remains of a U-shaped court leading to a four-chamber gallery. These would have been covered by a cairn, but these stones seem to have been removed.

References

National Monuments in County Sligo
Archaeological sites in County Sligo
Tombs in the Republic of Ireland